INS Buland is a 25 tonne bollard pull tugboat built by Hindustan Shipyard for the Indian Navy. It is the third ship of the series of 25-ton bollard pull tugboats after INS Balwan and INS Sahayak that were built within  10 months and delivered in January 2016 in time for International Fleet Review 2016. After the sea trials, the ship was flagged off by Commander A.S. Mitra (retired), Director (Shipbuilding) on 15 November 2016 and joined the Indian Navy at its home port of Port Blair.

See  also
Tugboats of the Indian Navy

References 

2016 ships
Ships built in India
Tugs of the Indian Navy